SS John H. B. Latrobe was a Liberty ship built in the United States during World War II. She was named after John H. B. Latrobe, an American lawyer and inventor. He invented the Latrobe Stove, also known as the "Baltimore Heater", a coal fired parlor heater made of cast iron that fit into fireplaces as an insert.

Construction
John H. B. Latrobe was laid down on 19 May 1942, under a Maritime Commission (MARCOM) contract, MCE hull 52, by the Bethlehem-Fairfield Shipyard, Baltimore, Maryland; she was sponsored by Miss Doreen Frances Almond, the daughter of H.L. Almond technical representative of the British Ministry of War Transport, and was launched on 13 July 1942.

History
She was allocated to Calmar Steamship Corp., on 28 July 1942. On 8 October 1947, she was Laid up in the James River Reserve Fleet, Lee Hall, Virginia. On 14 May 1952, she was laid up in the Suisun Bay Reserve Fleet, Suisun Bay, California. She was sold for nontransportation use on 15 April 1969, to Zidell Explorations, Inc. She was withdrawn from the fleet on 1 May 1969.

References

Bibliography

 
 
 
 

 

Liberty ships
Ships built in Baltimore
1942 ships
James River Reserve Fleet
Suisun Bay Reserve Fleet